AM1200 or AM 1200 may refer to:

1200 AM, a list of radio stations on 1200 kHz
AM1200 (film), a 2008 thriller starring Eric Lange

See also
 1200 (disambiguation)